The position of Hogan Lovells Professor of Law and Finance was established at the University of Oxford in 2007. It was created following the donation to the university of £103,007 by the London-based law firm Lovells (now part of Hogan Lovells). Originally designated as the Lovells Professor of Law and Finance, the post was renamed to its current title in June 2011.

, the only holder of the professorship has been John Armour, who was appointed with effect from 1 July 2007.  He holds the position in conjunction with a fellowship at Oriel College, Oxford.

References

Professorships at the University of Oxford
Professorships in law
2007 establishments in England
Oriel College, Oxford